Santi Suk may refer to:

Santi Suk, Chiang Mai
Santi Suk, Chiang Rai